This is a comprehensive discography of official recordings by We as Human, an American Christian rock band from Sandpoint, Idaho which consists of two studio albums, two extended plays, six singles and one music video.

Studio albums

EPs

Singles

Music videos

References 

Christian music discographies
Discographies of American artists
Rock music group discographies